This list of historical markers installed by the National Historical Commission of the Philippines (NHCP) in Metro Manila is an annotated list of people, places, or events in the region that have been commemorated by cast-iron plaques issued by the said commission. The plaques themselves are permanent signs installed in publicly visible locations on buildings, monuments, or in special locations.

While many Cultural Properties have historical markers installed, not all places marked with historical markers are designated into one of the particular categories of Cultural Properties.

Markers in Manila were first to be installed, following the establishment of the Philippine Historical Research and Markers Committee (PHRMC), the earliest predecessor of the NHCP. These were markers installed in 1934 for Church of San Agustin, Fort Santiago, Plaza McKinley, Roman Catholic Cathedral of Manila, San Sebastian Church, Concordia College, Manila Railroad Company, Dr. Lorenzo Negrao, and University of Santo Tomas (Intramuros site). The installation of markers were first limited to identify antiquities in Manila. Many markers were destroyed or lost due to World War II, along with the structures they represent, and many have been replaced by post-war markers.

In 2002, during the unveiling ceremony of the marker National Federation of Women's Club in the Philippines in Manila Hotel, former president Fidel Ramos joked that the curtain raising reminded him of striptease, and everybody laughed. That was the last time that the curtains were pulled upward, and from then, the unveiling has involved curtain pulling instead.

Following the move to relocate the marker of the first shot of the Filipino-American War from San Juan Bridge to the corner of Sociego and Silencio, Santa Mesa, Manila, former NHI Chairperson Ambeth Ocampo was declared persona non grata in San Juan. The NHCP then issued a replacement marker on the bridge, indicating it as a boundary between Filipino and American soldiers during the war, instead of it being the site of the first shot.

The marker concerning the First Congress of the Republic of the Philippines 1946-1949 was the biggest marker made, measuring at 52x72 inches. The 1946 marker was replaced on January 27, 2010, when governor Carlos Padilla of Nueva Vizcaya asked why his father, Constancio Padilla was missing from the list of the legislators. Luis Taruc, Jesus Lava, and Amado Yuson of the Democratic Alliance were not in the marker even though they appeared in the Congressional Records, while Luis Clarin, Carlos Fortich, and Narciso Ramos were in the 1946 marker, but not in the present Congressional Records. The Taruc, Lava, and Yuzon were dismissed from Congress, although the latter moved to the Nacionalista Party. Fortich died before completing his term and was replaced by his widow, Remedios Ozamis Fortich. Ramos won as the congressman for the 5th district of Pangasinan, but was appointed soon after to the United Nations, and was replaced by Cipriano Allas.

The historical marker (installed in 1939) of the Jesuit institution La Ignaciana in Santa Ana, Manila was stolen. A replacement marker was planned to be installed by the end of 2014, but it never took place.

The historical marker dedicated to Patricio Mariano in Escolta, Binondo received social media attention regarding its then derelict state. On January 28, 2015, on the occasion of Mariano's 80th death anniversary, the Escolta Revival Movement wrote to the NHCP regarding the situation of the marker. The NHCP renovated the marker the day after.

Days before the Bonifacio Day of 2017, reports surface the demolition of the Bonifacio centennial monument in Makati, along with its historical marker (entitled "Memorare"). It was done by the Department of Public Works and Highways to build a bridge connecting Ortigas and Bonifacio Global City business districts without informing and seeking the approval of the NHCP. DPWH, however, stated that it informed the local government unit and temporarily removed the statue to protect it from the construction. The department also said that it has allotted ₱39 million for the restoration of the park after the project has been completed in 2020.

A statue and marker (entitled Filipina Comfort Women Statue and "Memorare," respectively), remembering the comfort women of World War II, installed on December 8, 2017, along Baywalk, Roxas Boulevard, Malate, Manila, caught the attention from the officials from the Department of Foreign Affairs and the Japanese Embassy in Manila. In response, Teresita Ang-See, said that the memorial should not become an insult versus Japan. On April 27, 2018, the DPWH removed the memorial for a drainage improvement project along the Baywalk. Many individuals and groups, including Gabriela Women's Party condemned the removal, stating historical revisionism and submission to Japanese policy. They also stated that this has been an unlawful removal, since the heritage act protects markers and memorials by the NHCP. President Duterte remarked that the memorial can be placed in a private property, since the state would not want to "antagonize" other countries.

This article lists five hundred seventeen (517) markers from the National Capital Region.

Caloocan
This article lists two (3) markers from Caloocan.

Las Piñas
This article lists two (5) markers from Las Piñas City.

Makati
This article lists eighteen (18) markers from the City of Makati.

Malabon
This article lists four markers from the City of Malabon.

Mandaluyong
This article lists eight markers from Mandaluyong City.

Manila
This article lists three hundred seventy-seven (377) markers from the City of Manila, more than any city, municipality, province, and region (except NCR itself) in the Philippines.

Binondo
This article lists eighteen (18) markers from the Binondo district.

Ermita
This article lists ninety-four (94) markers from the Ermita district.

Intramuros
This article lists eighty-two (82) markers from the Intramuros district.

Malate
This article lists twenty-eight (18) markers from the Malate district.

Paco
This article lists fifteen (15) markers from the Paco district.

Pandacan
This article lists seven markers from the Pandacan district.

Port Area
This article lists five markers from the Port Area district.

Quiapo
This article lists thirteen (13) markers from the Quiapo district.

Sampaloc
This article lists twenty-three (23) markers from the Sampaloc district.

San Andres
This article lists zero markers from the San Andres district.

San Miguel
This article lists twenty-six (26) markers from the San Miguel district.

San Nicolas
This article lists eleven markers from the San Nicolas district.

Santa Ana
This article lists five markers from the Santa Ana district.

Santa Cruz
This article lists thirty-one (31) markers from the Santa Cruz district.

Santa Mesa
This article lists eight (9) markers from the Santa Mesa district.

Tondo
This article lists twenty-one (21) markers from the Tondo district.

Marikina
This article lists four markers from Marikina City.

Muntinlupa
This article lists four markers from the Muntinlupa City.

Navotas 
This article lists two markers from Navotas City.

Parañaque
This article lists six markers from Parañaque City.

Pasay
This article lists eleven markers from Pasay City.

Pasig
This article lists six markers from Pasig City.

Pateros
This article lists one marker from the Municipality of Pateros.

Quezon City
This article lists forty-six (46) markers from the Quezon City.

San Juan
This article lists thirteen (13) markers from the City of San Juan.

Taguig
This article lists four markers from Taguig City.

Valenzuela
This article lists four markers from Valenzuela City.

See also
List of Cultural Properties of the Philippines in Metro Manila

References

Footnotes

Bibliography

A list of sites and structures with historical markers, as of 16 January 2012
A list of institutions with historical markers, as of 16 January 2012

External links
A list of sites and structures with historical markers, as of 16 January 2012
A list of institutions with historical markers, as of 16 January 2012
National Registry of Historic Sites and Structures in the Philippines
Policies on the Installation of Historical Markers

Manila
Monuments and memorials in Metro Manila
Metro Manila-related lists